Bascanichthys inopinatus is an eel in the family Ophichthidae (worm/snake eels). It was described by John E. McCosker, Eugenia Brandt Böhlke, and James Erwin Böhlke in 1989. It is a tropical, marine eel which is known from the western central Pacific Ocean.

References

Ophichthidae
Fish described in 1989